The 5th Individual European Artistic Gymnastics Championships for both men and women were held at the Olympic Stadium in Moscow, Russia, from 17 to 21 April 2013.

Medal winners

Men's results

Individual all-around

Floor exercise

Pommel horse

Still rings

Vault

Parallel bars

Horizontal bar

Women's results

Qualification

Individual all-around

Vault

Uneven bars

Balance beam

Floor exercise

Medal count

Combined

Men

Women

References

2013 in gymnastics
2013
Sports competitions in Moscow
International gymnastics competitions hosted by Russia
2013 in Russian sport
2013 in European sport
April 2013 sports events in Europe
2013 in Moscow